Ji Min-hyuk (born 23 September 2001) is a  South Korean actor.

Filmography

Film

Television series

Television shows

Awards and nominations

References

External links 
 
 

2001 births
Living people
South Korean male television actors
South Korean male film actors